Royal Terrace Pier is owned and managed by the Port of London Authority (PLA) and is located adjacent to their headquarters at London River House in Gravesend.

History 
The Grade II listed pier was built in 1844 by the Gravesend Freehold Investment Company. Designed by architect John Baldry Redman the building cost was £9,200. On 7 March 1865 Princess Alexandra disembarked here when she arrived to marry the Prince of Wales (later Edward VII). 

The Gravesend Lifeboat Station moved to the pontoon at the end of the Royal Terrace Pier in June 2007. 

The Royal Terrace Pier Estate Company Limited was incorporated 29 June 1893 and dissolved 5 December 2012.

References 

Gravesham
Port of London
Piers in Kent